Appliqué lace refers to various types of lace where the decorative motifs are sewn as appliqués to an existing openwork fabric, such as tulle, netting, filet or bobbinet. Motifs may also be applied to drawn thread work and cut-work. The motifs can be either hand-made (via needle lace, bobbin lace or as embroidered fabric) or machine-made.

Embroidery
Lace